was a rear admiral in the Imperial Japanese Navy during World War II.

Biography
Kagawa was born in Hiroshima. He graduated from the 46th class of the Imperial Japanese Naval Academy, ranked 53rd out of 124 cadets. After his promotion to lieutenant, and tours of duty aboard the battleship  and cruiser , Kagawa attended advanced navigational training courses at the Naval War College (Japan). He received his first command — the destroyer  — on 16 November 1936. He then was captain of the destroyer  and executive officer of the cruiser .

Kagawa was promoted to captain on 15 October 1941, and after a series of staff positions, was appointed commander of the 31st Destroyer Group (Desdiv 31) on 12 February 1943. During the Battle of Cape St. George on 26 November 1943, Onami was sunk and Kagawa was killed in action. He was posthumously promoted to rear admiral.

Sources

External links

1895 births
1943 deaths
People from Hiroshima Prefecture
Japanese admirals of World War II
Imperial Japanese Navy admirals
Japanese military personnel killed in World War II